Nowakowskiella elegans is a species of fungi in the family Cladochytriaceae.

References

External links 
* 
  
 
 

Chytridiomycota
Fungi described in 1893